Kate Maravan (born 1968) is a British actress, acting teacher, and co-founder of White Box, a resident theatre company at the Actors Centre, in London. She is best known for playing Laura Dunnford in the British television comedy series Broken News. Maravan trained at RADA, and teaches the Meisner Technique at the Royal Court Theatre. She has also taught for the International Institute of Performing Arts in Paris.

Television
2012 Lewis  as Susanna Leland in S6:E2 “Generation of Vipers”
2016 The Coroner as Roz  Bryant in S2:E5 “The Captain’s Pipe”

External links

1968 births
Living people
20th-century English actresses
21st-century English actresses
20th-century English writers
21st-century English writers
Alumni of RADA
Date of birth missing (living people)
English soap opera actresses
English television actresses
English television writers
Place of birth missing (living people)
British women television writers